Open Sources 2.0 is a book published by O'Reilly Media. Following on the popularity of Open Sources: Voices from the Open Source Revolution, it is a second anthology of essays written by luminaries of the open source and free software movements. The essays explore open source's impact on the software industry and reveal how open source concepts are infiltrating other areas of commerce and society.

The book is edited by Chris DiBona, Mark Stone and Danese Cooper
The essays contained were written by Alolita Sharma,
Andrew Hessel,
Ben Laurie,
Boon-Lock Yeo,
Bruno Souza,
Chris DiBona,
Danese Cooper,
Doc Searls,
Eugene Eric Kim,
Gregorio Robles,
Ian Murdock,
Jeff Bates,
Jeremy Allison,
Jesus M. Gonzalez-Barahona,
Kim Polese,
Larry Sanger,
Louisa Liu,
Mark Stone,
Matthew N. Asay,
Michael Olson,
Mitchell Baker,
Pamela Jones,
Robert Adkins,
Russ Nelson,
Sonali K. Shah,
Stephen R. Walli,
Steven Weber,
Sunil Saxena,
Tim O'Reilly,
Wendy Seltzer

The first edition published in October 2005.

The book was published under the CC BY-NC-ND 2.5 license.

References

External links
 Official site
 Open Sources 2.0 full text, PDF, and other formats from archive.org

2005 non-fiction books
O'Reilly Media books
Books about free software